The Café Anglais (English café) was a famous French restaurant located at the corner of the Boulevard des Italiens (n° 13) and the Rue de Marivaux in Paris, France.

History 
Opened in 1802, the restaurant was named in honor of the Treaty of Amiens, a peace accord signed between Britain and France. In the beginning, its clientele were coachmen and domestic servants but later became frequented by actors and patrons of the nearby Opera House. In 1822, the new proprietor, Paul Chevreuil, turned it into a fashionable restaurant with a reputation for roasted and grilled meats. It was after the arrival of chef Adolphe Dugléré that the Café Anglais achieved its highest gastronomic reputation. It was then frequented by the wealthy and the aristocracy of Paris.

Although the white-faced exterior was austere, the interior was elaborately decorated with furniture in mahogany and walnut woods, and mirrors of gold leaf patina.

The building included 22 private rooms and lounges. The London food reviewer and historian Lt.-Col. Nathaniel Newnham-Davis stated "...the Anglais' was a great supping place, the little rabbit hutches of the entresol being the scene of some of the wildest and most interesting parties given by the great men of the Second Empire." The most famous was known as Le Grand 16.

Recipes Dugléré created included the Germiny Soup, dedicated to the head of the Banque de France, the Comte de Germiny. Dugléré also created the Pommes Anna, reputedly named in honor of the famous courtesan of the Second Empire, Anna Deslions. He also composed the menu called the "Three Emperors Dinner" in honor of Tsar Alexander II, Kaiser Wilhelm I and Otto von Bismarck for the Exposition Universelle in 1867 in Paris.

The restaurant closed in 1913. It has been replaced by a building in Art Nouveau style. The restaurant is mentioned in part 3 of Honoré de Balzac's Le Père Goriot, chapter 10 of Gustave Flaubert's Sentimental Education, chapter 10 in Émile Zola's Nana, Guy de Maupassant's short story Les Bijoux, Marcel Proust's In Search of Lost Time (towards the beginning of volume 2, "Within a Budding Grove"), in Umberto Eco's The Prague Cemetery, in The Alice B. Toklas Cookbook, chapter 20 in Henry James's The Portrait of a Lady as well as in Karen Blixen's short story Babette's Feast. The title character Babette Hersant was the head chef at the Café Anglais before fleeing to Denmark. It is also mentioned in Henry James’, “The American”, chapter one (Christopher Newman “supped” there the night before visiting the Louvre).

Notes

Buildings and structures in the 2nd arrondissement of Paris
Former buildings and structures in Paris
19th century in Paris
Coffeehouses and cafés in Paris
Restaurants in Paris
1802 establishments in France
1913 disestablishments in France
20th century in Paris